Triazolobenzodiazepines (TBZD) are a class of benzodiazepine (BZD) derivative pharmaceutical drugs.  Chemically, they differ from other benzodiazepines by having an additional fused triazole ring.

Examples include:
 Adinazolam
 Alprazolam
 Bromazolam
 Clonazolam
 Estazolam
 Flualprazolam
 Flubromazolam
 Flunitrazolam
 Nitrazolam
 Pyrazolam
 Triazolam
 Zapizolam

Synthesis
Synthesis of 1-methyltriazolobenzodiazepines (alprazolam type) is possible by heating 1,4-benzodiazepin-2-thiones with hydrazine and acetic acid in n-butanol under reflux.

References

External links